Arthur A. Wilson (born 16 March 1968) is an Indian cinematographer. He has predominantly worked in south Indian films of languages such as Tamil and Telugu. He is best known for his successful movies Sundara Purushan,V.I.P,Vaanathai Pola,Aanandam, Anbe Sivam, Naan Kadavul, and Imsai Arasan 23rd Pulikesi, and repeated collaborations with directors like Kamal Haasan, Bala, K.S. Ravikumar and Tollywood’s Boyapati Srinu on their films. The two time winner of Tamil Nadu State Award for Best Cinematographer is well known for his poetic and painting-like cinematography.

Early life

Arthur Wilson was born in Salem, Tamil Nadu, India. He grew up with a passion for watching movies and developed an interest in studying paintings and had inspirations from them. Arthur Wilson completed the three year Diploma at the M.G.R. Government Film and Television Training Institute.

Career

Though he started his career by assisting in films like Inaindha Kaigal. Arthur A Wilson mostly gathered his technical and practical skills by self thought.

His first movie was Sundara Purushan (1996) Tamil film starring Livingston and Rambha in lead role and directed by Sabapathy Dekshinamurthy, got high praise and much critical acclaim and won Tamil Nadu State Film Award for Best Cinematographer. He continued to work with popular directors as cinematographer in Tamil films V. I. P. (1997), Sollamale (1998), En Swasa Kaatre (1999), Jodi (1999), Vaanathaippola (2000), Aanandham (2001).

In 2002 he got his first collaboration with actor Kamal Haasan for the movie Panchathantiram directed by K.S. Ravikumar. After its success the Collaboration continued for Kamal Haasan’s consecutive films Pammal K. Sambandam (2002) and Anbe Sivam (2003), for which Wilson again won accolades and also received several awards and nominations, particular for the latter one.

Subsequently, Arthur Wilson got offers from the Telugu film industry as well, debuting in Tollywood with the 2005 debutant Boyapati Srinu directed action film Bhadra, starring Ravi Teja and Meera Jasmine. It turned out to be a huge success at the box office and became one of the biggest hits in Ravi Teja's career.

In 2006, one of the most acclaimed and most successful Tamil comedy film Imsai Arasan 23rd Pulikesi with debut director Simbudevan, turning him into one of the most sought after young cinematographers in Kollywood.

In 2009 Arthur Wilson joined hands with director Bala for the most challenging and riveting subject Naan Kadavul, got high praise and critical acclaim with much praise for the film's atmospheric tone and realism. It was an extremely difficult process to shoot with the specially abled characters, required a larger amount of time to shoot each scene, which delayed the production. He won Tamil Nadu State Film Award for Best Cinematographer for that film and several nominations for National Award and several award categories.
Later the combination of the duo’s joined again for the movie Avan Ivan (2011).

He returned to Tollywood to work on the films of director Boyapati Srinu’s Simha (2010), Dammu (2012), Vinaya Vidheya Rama (2019) from time to time.

During filming Sundara Purushan (1996) there were no availability of advanced camera equipments like Jimmy Jib and Akela cranes. Arthur Wilson used to do make some rigs himself and shot the song sequences of “Settapa Mathi” The rig was called by his name “Wilson Wheel Rig”.

Whilst the songs screening of the movie VIP (1997), the picturization was awed and applauded by every people presented. Impressed by the song visuals and locations of “Eechan kaattula muyal onnu..” song, Producer AVM Saravanan praised cinematographer Arthur Wilson for the visualization and asked the whereabouts of the location, was awe struck to know that the location was a set on floors and lit up to look like a real location.

Arthur Wilson also gained a prestigious value with all of his filmography that every collaboration of him with a new debutant director, the movie will make a great success and benchmark. In an interview after the movie Aanandham (2001), the debutant director Lingusamy said “Arthur Wilson gave the comfort and guidance to the first time director and lead the way without any dominance. The guidance made the magic to happen in every possible way”.He was work in 10 new first time directors . He is the popular cinematographer in Tamil and Telugu movie industry.

Sundara Purushan (1996)
Sollamale (1998)
Aanandham (2001)
Shahjahan (2001)
Bhadra (2005) 
Imsai Arasan 23rd Pulikesi (2006)

The success list started and extends from his debut to till date.

Arthur Wilson’s career also extends to the field of ad-photography and TV commercials with renowned directors like Jd-Jerry and Dir . K Vasanth.sir

Awards
Tamil Nadu State Film Award for Best Cinematographer for Sundara Purushan (1996)
Tamil Nadu State Film Award for Best Cinematographer for Naan Kadavul'' (2008)

Filmography

References

Place of birth missing (living people)
Living people
People from Salem district
1968 births
Cinematographers from Tamil Nadu